Joey Lee Dillard (1924–2009) was an American linguist known for his work on African-American Vernacular English.

Selected bibliography
Dillard's works include:

References

Linguists from the United States
1924 births
2009 deaths
20th-century linguists
Linguists of English